Ian Maddieson (born September 1, 1942 in Watford, United Kingdom) is British-American linguist and professor emeritus of linguistics at the University of New Mexico, in the United States. He has served as Vice-President of the International Phonetic Association, and Secretary of the Association for Laboratory Phonology. Maddieson is best known for his work in phonetics, and phonological typology. He spent most of his academic career at the University of California, Berkeley, where he often collaborated with Peter Ladefoged in describing the patterns of speech sounds in the world's spoken languages.

Books
 
 Based on data from about 400 languages, the book describes the known contrasting phonetic categories, the ways in which the phonemic sounds may differ in human languages.
 Maddieson, Ian, Patterns of Sounds,
 Cambridge University Press, 1984, 
 Cambridge University Press, 2009, 
 The book analyzes the frequencies and distributions of the phonemic sounds among languages. The results are based on UPSID (the UCLA Phonological Segment Inventory Database).

References

External links
 Ian Maddieson's Homepage
 Ian Maddieson's Homepage at the University of Berkeley

Linguists from the United States
Phoneticians
Living people
University of California, Berkeley College of Letters and Science faculty
University of New Mexico faculty
1942 births